Prairie Creek Township is one of twelve townships in Vigo County, Indiana, United States. As of the 2010 census, its population was 1,195 and it contained 494 housing units.

Geography

Unincorporated communities
 Hutton
 Prairie Creek
 Vigo

Adjacent townships
 Prairieton Township (northeast)
 Linton Township (east)
 Curry Township, Sullivan County (southeast)
 Fairbanks Township, Sullivan County (south)
 York Township, Clark County, Illinois (southwest)
 Darwin Township, Clark County, Illinois (west)

Cemeteries
The township contains these four cemeteries: Lykens, Shattuck, Watson and Westlawn.

Rivers
 Wabash River

School districts
 Vigo County School Corporation

Political districts
 Indiana's 8th congressional district
 State House District 45
 State Senate District 39

References
 United States Census Bureau 2007 TIGER/Line Shapefiles
 United States Board on Geographic Names (GNIS)
 IndianaMap

External links

Townships in Vigo County, Indiana
Terre Haute metropolitan area
Townships in Indiana